Arakkallan Mukkalkkallan is a 1974 Indian Malayalam film, directed by P. Bhaskaran and produced by M. P. Rao and M. R. K. Moorthy. The film stars Prem Nazir, Adoor Bhasi, Jayabharathi and Srividya in the lead roles. The film had musical score by V. Dakshinamoorthy.

Cast

Prem Nazir as Nagan/Arakallkan
Adoor Bhasi as Aruvikkara Thampy/Mukkalkallan
Jayabharathi as Princess Mankamma / Maala
Srividya as Princess Alli
K. P. Ummer as Ugran Varma
Kaviyoor Ponnamma as Queen Lakshmi
Bahadoor as Nanu
Paul Vengola
KPAC Lalitha as Kaavu
T. R. Omana
T. S. Muthaiah
Kunchan
Sreelatha Namboothiri as Kunjamma
Kaduvakulam Antony
N. Govindankutty
Philomina
Radhamani
Vijayalalitha

Soundtrack
The music was composed by V. Dakshinamoorthy and the lyrics were written by P. Bhaskaran.

References

External links
 

1974 films
1970s Malayalam-language films
Films directed by P. Bhaskaran